Kris Russell (born May 2, 1987) is a Canadian professional ice hockey defenceman currently an unrestricted free agent. He most recently played for the Edmonton Oilers of the National Hockey League (NHL). He was originally drafted in the third round, 67th overall, by the Columbus Blue Jackets in the 2005 NHL Entry Draft and played four seasons with the team before moving on to the St. Louis Blues, Calgary Flames and Dallas Stars. He has also played for TPS and Oulun Kärpät in the Finnish Liiga.

Russell was a top defenceman in junior hockey with the Western Hockey League (WHL)'s Medicine Hat Tigers. He was a member of two WHL championship teams, was twice named the WHL's top defenceman and won the Four Broncos Memorial Trophy as the WHL's most outstanding player in 2006–07. Internationally, Russell has represented Canada on several occasions: he was a member of two gold medal-winning teams at the World Junior Championship and has played in two World Championships. Russell is known for his ability and willingness to block shots, formerly having held the NHL record for blocked shots; he has since been surpassed by Mark Giordano. He and his twin brother Ryan briefly played together in Columbus.

Early life
Kris Russell was born May 2, 1987, in Red Deer, Alberta. He has an identical twin brother, Ryan, born to mother Terri and father Doug. They grew up in the nearby village of Caroline. Doug was a professional bull fighter on Alberta's rodeo circuit – someone who protects bull riders while they escape the ring following their rides by distracting the bulls – and made four appearances at the Canadian Finals Rodeo, but left the sport when his sons were born. Kris was coached by his father for much of his minor hockey career, and was moved to defence by Doug when he was ten years old.

Playing career

Junior
The Medicine Hat Tigers selected Russell with their eighth round selection, 138th overall at the 2002 Western Hockey League (WHL) Bantam Draft. He played four seasons with the Tigers and the first time he played Ryan, who was a member of the Kootenay Ice, in a game, the brothers fought each other. Kris described the event as "fun" while noting that neither was trying to hurt their brother. He was a member of league championship teams in his first season, 2003–04, and his last, 2006–07. Russell was highly decorated in his junior career.  He was named to a WHL All-Star Team three times and was twice named recipient of the Brad Hornung Trophy as the league's most sportsmanlike player. He twice led the league in goal scoring and won the Bill Hunter Memorial Trophy as top defenceman in both 2005–06 and 2006–07.  In his final WHL season, Russell was also named the winner of the Four Broncos Memorial Trophy as the WHL's most outstanding player and was named the Canadian Hockey League's Defenceman of the Year.

Internationally, Russell twice represented Canada as a member of the national junior team. He first played at the 2006 World Junior Championship where he recorded one goal and three assists for the gold medal-winning Canadians. Returning for the 2007 tournament, Russell tied Jonathan Toews for the team lead with four goals as Canada again won the gold medal.

Professional career

Columbus and St. Louis

The Columbus Blue Jackets selected Russell with their third round pick, 67th overall, at the 2005 NHL Entry Draft. Shorter and lighter than his peers throughout minor hockey, he was often told he was too small to play in the NHL. Listed at five feet, ten inches tall, Russell defied expectations and earned a spot with the Blue Jackets in his first professional season, 2007–08. He made his NHL debut and scored his first point with an assist in a 4–0 victory over the Anaheim Ducks on October 5, 2007. Russell's first two NHL goals came on January 22, 2008, against goaltender Mike Smith, and was named the first star in a 4–2 win over the Dallas Stars. He added eight assists to finish with 10 points in 67 games for Columbus.

Russell spent the majority of the 2008–09 season with the Blue Jackets but also played 14 games with their American Hockey League (AHL) affiliate, the Syracuse Crunch. He had 21 points in 66 games with Columbus and added a goal and an assist in his first four NHL playoff games. He led Blue Jackets' defencemen with seven goals in 2009–10 and set a career high with 23 points in 73 games in 2010–11. He was briefly a teammate of his brother as the Blue Jackets acquired Ryan prior to the 2011–12 season. However,  Russell only played 12 games for Columbus that season, as he was traded to the St. Louis Blues in exchange for Nikita Nikitin in a November 11, 2011, trade. The deal reunited Russell with Ken Hitchcock, who had previously coached him in Columbus before becoming the head coach of the Blues.

In 55 games combined between Columbus and St. Louis, Russell scored 12 points and he made his second Stanley Cup playoff appearance by playing nine post-season games with St. Louis. When the 2012–13 NHL season was delayed by a labour dispute, he signed with TPS in the Finnish SM-liiga. He suffered a slight tear to his Medial collateral ligament early in the season and missed some time before rejoining TPS. He recorded 14 points in 15 games before returning to St. Louis when the NHL season finally began. With the Blues, Russell recorded seven points in 33 games but dropped down the Blues' depth chart and did not appear in any 2013 playoff games for the team.

A restricted free agent following the season, Blues management expressed doubt he would be one of the club's top seven defencemen. He was placed on waivers and went unclaimed. The Calgary Flames acquired Russell on July 5, 2013, in exchange for a fifth round selection at the 2014 NHL Entry Draft and signed him to a one-year, $1.5 million contract.

Calgary Flames
Russell was leaned on heavily in his first year in Calgary, emerging as a top-four defensively-oriented defenseman. Paired most frequently with Dennis Wideman, the two formed the Flames' second pairing for the majority of the season. Russell set new career-highs in assists and points in 2013–14, tallying 22 and 29 in those respective categories. He also finished second on the team in blocked shots with 201, only behind Chris Butler (211).

As the Flames improved significantly in 2014–15, so did Russell. Once again, he posted new career-highs in assists and points, with 30 and 34, respectively, and he also led the NHL in blocked shots with 283. This mark currently sits as the NHL record for most shots blocked by a single player in a season. With star and captain Mark Giordano injured late in the season as the Flames pushed towards a playoff spot, Russell emerged as a temporary top-pairing defenseman in lieu, forming a dangerous shutdown tandem with Wideman once again. This continued into the 2015 playoffs, as Russell proved to be a clutch force throughout the Flames' six-game victory over the Vancouver Canucks in the first round. One notable moment came in Game 1 of the series, which the Flames had trailed until just past the mid-way mark of the third period; first, David Jones scored to tie the game, and then Russell fired a wrist shot from the point which beat Canucks goaltender Eddie Läck to put the Flames up by one goal with under 30 seconds remaining. Russell finished the post-season with seven points, third on the Flames.

The Flames regressed in 2015–16, as did Russell. His assist and point totals dramatically sank to just 11 and 15, as the Flames dropped in the standings and missed the 2016 playoffs. With this fate becoming evident, Flames general manager Brad Treliving sought to sell some of his assets at the trade deadline. With his contract expiring at the end of the year, Russell was traded to the Dallas Stars in exchange for defenseman Jyrki Jokipakka, prospect Brett Pollock and a conditional second-round pick (ultimately used to select Dillon Dubé).

Dallas and Edmonton
In Dallas, Russell was relied on to play top-pairing minutes, but the team fizzled out in the second round to the St. Louis Blues. Russell was held goalless throughout the playoffs, and he was not re-signed by the Stars in the off-season.

On October 7, 2016, with the Edmonton Oilers having cleared cap space in the trade of Nail Yakupov, Russell belatedly signed as a free agent to a one-year, $3.1 million contract for the 2016–17 season. Used in a very defensively-minded role, Russell enjoyed limited offensive success but slotted in as the team's de facto fourth defenseman alongside fellow veteran Andrej Sekera. Much like the Flames in 2015, the Oilers made the playoffs in 2016–17 season for the first time in years, but lost in the second round to the Anaheim Ducks, and for the second year in a row, Russell was held goalless in the playoffs.

Encouraged by his play, the Oilers announced on June 23, 2017, they had re-signed Russell to a four-year contract worth $4 million per season. During a game against the Vegas Golden Knights in November 2021, Russell became the NHL's all-time leader in shots blocked with 1,999.

Career statistics

Regular season and playoffs

International

Awards and honours

References
Career statistics:

External links

1987 births
Living people
Calgary Flames players
Canadian expatriate ice hockey players in Finland
Canadian expatriate ice hockey players in the United States
Canadian ice hockey defencemen
Columbus Blue Jackets draft picks
Columbus Blue Jackets players
Dallas Stars players
Edmonton Oilers players
HC TPS players
Ice hockey people from Alberta
Medicine Hat Tigers players
St. Louis Blues players
Sportspeople from Red Deer, Alberta
Canadian twins
Twin sportspeople